Jaanus Rahumägi (born 5 September 1963 in Aruküla) is an Estonian businessman and politician. He has been member of X and XI Riigikogu.

He is a member of Estonian Reform Party.

In 2018, Jaanus Rahumägi was selected as one of the hundred most memorable residents of the century as a result of a public poll held as part of the campaign "100 Residents of the Century".

References

1963 births
Living people
Estonian Reform Party politicians
Estonian businesspeople
Members of the Riigikogu, 2003–2007
Members of the Riigikogu, 2007–2011
Tallinn University alumni
People from Raasiku Parish
Members of the Riigikogu, 2011–2015